Cardinal Vaughan Memorial School is a Roman Catholic day secondary school in Holland Park with approximately 950 students.

History 

After the 1903 death of the third Archbishop of Westminster, Herbert, Cardinal Vaughan, an appeal was made to raise funds to found a boys' school to be named as a memorial to him; some £20,000 was subscribed. The school was founded in 1914; the founders included Viscount Fitzalan, the Duke of Norfolk and the Marquis of Ripon. The Vaughan School opened its doors in the Victorian building now known as Addison Hall, as a private school, to twenty-nine boys on 21 September 1914, appointing Canon Driscoll as the first headmaster.

In the 1920s, the school expanded and it was decided to seek recognition by the Board of Education for the grant as an independent day school. The first Higher Certificates with Distinction were achieved in 1926, the first classical scholarship (at Christ's College, Cambridge), and the first ordination of Vaughan boys to the priesthood. In 1937, this plot was exchanged for the present site at Twickenham, adjacent to the international Rugby Football Union ground.

Enrollment had grown to 220 by 1928, and neared 300 by 1938. The school was evacuated to Beaumont College, Windsor, during the course of the Second World War. It moved back in the summer of 1945. Thirty-nine old boys who were killed in the War are named in the School's Roll of Honour, including the first Victoria Cross of the war in the Royal Air Force, Flying Officer Donald Edward Garland.

School fees were abolished after the war, as the Vaughan School transitioned from a public school to a state-funded grammar school under the 1944 Education Act. However, there were concerns about the low standards of new admissions, whose primary education had suffered during the evacuation; in 1948, Cardinal Griffin referred to this as a "time of crisis" for the school, though it was alleviated through a series of programmes to inspire the students' interest.

In the early and mid-1950s, the curriculum shifted from the Classics to include Advanced A-Level subjects. A new building was opened in 1964 to accommodate the growing enrollment. In the 1970s, the Inner London Education Authority (ILEA) and board of governors considered various reorganization proposals in the amalgamation of schools. The school began to take pupils of all abilities in 1977 and became an all-ability school. Girls were first admitted to the sixth form in 1977. The school became a voluntary-aided public school and drew pupils chiefly, but not exclusively, from Inner London.

The school saw expansions in 2000, 2005 and 2014. The school was granted specialist status for mathematics, computing and science.

While nominally a state comprehensive, it has resisted attempts by local governmental and religious authority figures to widen the accessibility criteria for potential pupils. In 2009, the school was referred to the admissions watchdog amid claims that its admissions policy was 'elitist' and 'penalised the less devout'. Consequently, the school was forced to modify its admissions criteria.

Uniform 

Pupils in Years 7–11 dress in the black Vaughan suit with the Vaughan Lower School Tie, a tie that bears the school colours. In sixth form, pupils are required to wear the grey Vaughan suit and sixth form tie, bearing an extra white stripe, and/or any sporting ties. Girls who join the school at this time are required to wear the Vaughan maroon blazer and grey skirt. The Head Boy and Head Girl will wear a specially commissioned Blue and Maroon Robe. At various times of the year, including the Vaughan Speech Night, teachers are required to wear full academic dress.

Headmasters

Canon Driscoll (1914–1928) 

Hired at a salary of £200 per year, Canon Driscoll was appointed as the first headmaster. He confessed to having spent the summer months worrying about how many boys would face him on opening day. Two classes were held in the top rooms. Driscoll took one and Father W. Horgan the other.

Under Driscoll's guidance, the school found its feet during the Great War. Academic standards were high leading to the School and Higher Certificates of the Oxford and Cambridge Joint Board. Enrollment grew and enabled Driscol to build a young and energetic teaching staff.

In the autumn of 1927 Canon Driscoll's health began to fail and he died 29 December, at the age of 57.

Monsignor Canon Vance (1928–1948) 

Dr Vance was known as a scholar and writer when he succeeded Driscoll as headmaster. He ran a tight ship: strict punctuality was expected, students were not permitted to write left-handed without a medical certificate documenting a necessary deviation, and teachers were instructed on a prescribed manner of blackboard writing. He took an intense pride in all things English, instilling a sense of patriotism in the student body.

While the school was evacuated to Windsor for the course of the Second World War, Vance was concerned about the standards of behaviour of the boys under wartime conditions. It was made clear to the boys: that making light of discomfort was manly; that writing cheery and interesting letters home would ease the troubles of their families; and that it was a point of honour to never complain. He later took on a Churchillian tone, to instil the qualities of the English tradition and that of resistance, courage and devoutness.

Following the war, the Vaughan School transitioned from a public school to a state-funded grammar school. In 1947, Vance expressed concerns about the low standards of new admissions, whose primary education had suffered terribly during the evacuation. He resigned as headmaster in 1948.

Canon Butcher (1948–1952) 

Father Reginald Butcher had served the Vaughan School during its evacuation to Windsor. Under his direction as headmaster, a large programme of activities was established to interest the boys in art, music and literature. He cared for the religious life of the school and creating a union between the artistic and the spiritual. He was especially pleased by the attention given to religious music, to religious art and to the works of the Catholic writers. In 1952, Butcher was transferred, appointed as president of St Edmund's College, Ware. He was later nominated as a Canon of Westminster and a papal monsignor.

Monsignor Kenefeck (1952–1976) 
Father Richard Kenefeck served his entire career at the Vaughan School, beginning in 1938, and was its longest-serving headmaster. He was primarily concerned with the expansion of the sixth form. Advanced A-Level subjects were introduced to a curriculum which had largely been devoted to the Classics, with mathematics and sciences added in 1956. Also of concern was organising the school into a new building which was opened in 1964 to accommodate the growing enrollment.

Fr. Anthony Pellegrini (1976–1997) 

Anthony Pellegrini, the first headmaster who was not a cleric, was appointed in 1976. He had joined the school as a general subjects teacher immediately after graduating from the London School of Economics, and in 1969 was appointed deputy head.

Pellegrini saw the school's transition from a selective grammar school to a voluntary-aided school, taking in students with learning difficulties. He also helped to establish a community service unit, which organized student volunteers.

Michael Gormally (1997–2009) 
In September 1997, Michael Gormally became headmaster and oversaw continuing expansion of the school. A mezzanine floor in the Main Building was opened to sixth form pupils, new music rooms were opened in 2005, and the school was granted specialist status for mathematics, computing, and science.

Mr Gormally fell ill in 2008 and retired formally in 2009.

Charles Eynaud, BSc (2009–2011) 

For a two-year period Charles Eynaud was acting headmaster.

Paul Stubbings, MA (from 2011) 
In October 2011, the Governors appointed Paul Stubbings as the school's headmaster. Academic standards remained high; The Times ranked Cardinal Vaughan as the highest attaining school at both A-Level and GCSE in the country in 2013 and 2014.

Buildings 

The school is divided into four main buildings, Addison Hall ( the Old Building), the New Building, the "Centenary Building" and the Pellegrini Building. The later two are adjoined on the main grounds on the west side of Addison Road, with Addison Hall on the east side of the road.

Structural work was conducted on Addison Hall when dry rot was discovered in the late 1940s.  At this same time, the outer wall of the main hall was found to be in danger of collapse and steel supports were sunk into the wall to make it safe.

The school chapel was opened on 19 January 1915, decorated by Thomas Seadon with life-size paintings of Thomas More and John Fisher Oater, the patron saints of the school.

The New Building was officially opened in June 1964. A third floor was later added, housing music facilities with a recording studio, a music technology suite, nine practice rooms, a song school for choral singing, two full-sized classrooms and a large rehearsal hall.

The school's design technology and information technology facilities make up the majority of the Pellegrini Building. The Centenary Building is an extension completed in 2014, with eight classrooms and two art suites.

The school has a sports pavilion and playing fields in Twickenham opposite Twickenham Stadium, the UK's main rugby stadium. The pavilion was rebuilt and opened in January 1995.

Sport 

The school fields seven Football teams and an equal number of rugby union teams. It has no cricket team. The school's athletes participate in regional and national competitions. Girls in the sixth form play netball.

Rugby 
The school's home grounds are positioned adjacent to Twickenham Stadium, the home of the Rugby Football Union (RFU). The rugby season commences in September with trials for all age groups . All rugby teams play Saturday morning fixtures for the duration of the Michaelmas term. In addition to Saturday morning fixtures, senior teams are involved in midweek and cup fixtures.

Vaughan boys compete in many competitions across the country and against other schools, and also in annual House Varsity games .

Senior Rugby players also play Saturday morning and midweek fixtures during the Lent term. In addition to Rugby Union the school also enters various Rugby Sevens tournaments which generally take place during the Lent term.

Rowing 
The school has the use of Barn Elms Boat Club, where boys can learn to row and scull . The school has produced Olympic Rowers.

Football 
Football fixtures are played throughout the Michaelmas and Lent terms. Only the 1st and 2nd XI teams play Saturday morning fixtures during the Michaelmas term. The school's football teams are also entered in various local and national cup competitions. Games for these competitions are played midweek.

Extra-curricular activities 

Pupils founded a music society in 1935. Pupils may, at their families' cost, study musical instruments, including the piano, the organ (of which the school has three), strings, brass, woodwind and percussion. There are also several choirs and orchestras: the Schola Cantorum, the Sixth Form Choir, the School Choir, the School Orchestra, the Concert Band, the Junior String Ensemble, the Senior Strings and the Chamber Orchestra, all of which give regular concerts . The school's Big Band has taken part in national competitions and has toured in France, Spain, Netherlands and the US. It has performed alongside Salena Jones and Jason Yarde and had commissions from Bob Mintzer, Frank Griffith, Jeff Jarvis and Richard Harris .

Schola Cantorum 

The Schola Cantorum is the School's liturgical choir, founded in 1980 and made up of boys aged 11 to 18. The Schola sings at school Masses, and has frequent external engagements. It has performed at many of London's major venues, twice represented Great Britain at the Loreto Festival in Italy, toured internationally, and performed before the Pope. It has performed professionally with the London Symphony Orchestra, the Bach Choir and the Chorus of the Royal Opera, and been featured on film soundtracks including Harry Potter and the Deathly Hallows – Part 1, Life of Pi and Paddington. The choir has also appeared on BBC Radio 4's Sunday Worship, Vatican Radio, and the religious choral programme Songs of Praise on BBC television .

The Schola has recorded a number of CDs, including hymn collection Praise to the holiest, Christmas carol collection Sing in Exultation, and Lauda Sion by Mendelssohn and works by Dupré and others .

The Schola Cantorum is currently led by Scott Price, who serves as conductor and director of music at the school.

Notable former pupils (Old Vaughanians)

Arts and entertainment
 Roger Delgado (1918–1973), actor
 Richard Greene (1918–1985), actor
 Dominic Holland, comedian
 Derek Marlowe, English playwright, novelist, screenwriter and painter
 Joseph O'Conor, Anglo-Irish actor and playwright
 Helen Oyeyemi (b. 1984), novelist
 Jan Pieńkowski, author and illustrator of children's books
 Richard Daniel Roman (b. 1965), songwriter and record producer
 Oritsé Williams, member of boy band JLS
 Dan Stopczynski (b. 1957), aka DJ Dan, shotgun on Good Morning Marlow, MarlowFM
Athletes
 Martin Cross (b. 1957), rower, gold medalist at the 1984 Summer Olympics
 Maurice Edelston (1918–1976), footballer and sports commentator
 Kevin Gallen (b. 1975), footballer
 Garry Herbert, rowing cox, gold medalist at the 1992 Summer Olympics
 Bernard Joy (1911–1984), footballer
 Eddie Newton (b. 1971), footballer
 Udo Onwere (b. 1971), footballer
 Paul Parker (b. 1964), footballer
Military figures
 Paddy Finucane (1920–1942), RAF pilot during the Second World War
 Donald Edward Garland (1918–1940), RAF pilot during the Second World War
Politicians
 Jack Dromey, British Labour Party politician and trade unionist
Scholars
 P. J. Honey, Vietnamese-language scholar and historian
 Mark Langham, Cambridge University Catholic Chaplain
 Gerard Lyons, British economist
 Robert Bolgar, classical scholar, fellow of King’s College, Cambridge
 A. F. Shore, British Egyptologist and museum curator
 Dan van der Vat, journalist, writer and military historian

Roll of Honour

Between 1939-1945, thirty-nine Old Vaughanians gave their lives in the successful struggle against Fascism.  "We offer these records with pride."

Peter Bona [f.], Charles Brasseur [d.], Peter Byrne [i.], Geoffrey Chilton [b.], Reginal Coath [r.], John Collins [e.], Terence Culnane [a.], George Dale [a.], Joseph Daniel [e.], Michael D'Arcy [g.], Sydney Darwood [a.], Robert De Sandoval [b.], Thadde D'Hondt [a.], Rowland Ennor [h.], Desmond Garland [a.], Donald Garland [a.], Joseph Gordon [c.], Vincent Halliday-Sutherland [a.], Francis Head [l.], Paddy Finucane [a.], Arthur Hirons [a.], Louis Howard [a.], Harold Jordan [p.], John Kelly [k.], William Lundon [a.], Phillip McErlain [q.], David Monteith [n.], Michael Morton[a.], John Osborne [a.], Henri Phillipe [a.], Stanley Rowe [b.], Anthony Russell [e.], David Sewell [j.], William Sherratt [o.], Andrew Strange [i.], Kenneth Swadling [a.], Frank Vance [a.], Cecil Wall [c.], John Young [a.], Bernard ODonoghue [m.]

[a.] Royal Air Force, [b.] Royal Navy, [c.] Fleet Air Arm, [d.] Royal Electrical & Mechanical Engineers, [e.] Royal Artillery, [f.] Royal Army Service Corps, [g.] Royal Fusiliers, [h.] Royal Naval Reserve, [i.] Royal Air Force Volunteer Reserve, [j.] Inns of Court Regiment, [k.] Royal Ulster Rifles, [l.] Royal Naval Volunteer Reserve, [m.] 3rd Madras Regiment, [n.] Indian Army., [o.] Royal West Kents, [p.] Royal Armoured Corps, [q.] 1st London Irish Rifles, [r.] 5th Beds & Herts

References

External links

1914 establishments in England
Academies in the Royal Borough of Kensington and Chelsea
Catholic points-based admission school
Catholic secondary schools in the Archdiocese of Westminster
Educational institutions established in 1914
Secondary schools in the Royal Borough of Kensington and Chelsea